Cala Romàntica or Playa Romàntica is a beach and resort on the east coast of Majorca, about 10 kilometres south of Porto Cristo, and east of the town of Manacor.

References

Beaches of Mallorca
Populated places in Mallorca
Beaches of the Balearic Islands